Ian Thorpe: The Swimmer is a 2012 documentary covering the lead up to the 2012 Summer Olympics, where Ian Thorpe undertook a failed attempt to comeback. The documentary is directed by Gregor Jordan and was produced for the ABC by Finch in association with Matchbox Pictures.

Ian Thorpe failed to make the 2012 Australian team, but began his transition to being a television personality.

References

External links
 
 Official synopsis
 
Screen Australia Annual Report 2012/13

Ian Thorpe
2012 documentary films
2012 films
2012 television films
Australian documentary television films
Films about Olympic swimming and diving
Films directed by Gregor Jordan
Television series by Matchbox Pictures
2010s English-language films